The 1997 World Weightlifting Championships were held in Chiang Mai, Thailand from December 6 to December 14. The men's competition in the 83 kg division was staged on 11 December 1997.

Medalists

Records

Results

References
Weightlifting World Championships Seniors Statistics, Pages 9–10 

1997 World Weightlifting Championships